Rikacha Tuna (Quechua rikacha Arracacia xanthorrhiza, tuna slope, "rikacha slope", Hispanicized spelling Ricachatuna) is a  mountain in the Andes of Peru. It is located in the Pachitea Province, Panao District. Rikacha Tuna lies northeast of K'uchu Hanka.

References

Mountains of Peru
Mountains of Huánuco Region